No Room To Die (also known as Hanging for Django and A Noose for Django) is a 1969 Italian Spaghetti Western film directed by Sergio Garrone.

It was shown as part of a retrospective on Spaghetti Westerns at the 64th Venice International Film Festival.

Plot summary
A pair of bounty hunters team up to hunt down an outlaw gang that has been sneaking illegal immigrants over the border to sell as slaves.

Cast

References

External links

1969 films
1960s Italian-language films
Spaghetti Western films
1969 Western (genre) films
Cockfighting in film
1960s Italian films